Abdullah Saleh Ali Al-Othaim  is a Saudi businessman. He is the chairman and founder of Abdullah Al-Othaim Markets, one of Saudi's largest retail companies. He is also the chairman of Al Othaim Hoding Company.

In 2015 Forbes listed Abdullah Al-Othaim as the 61st richest man in the Arab world, with an estimated net worth of US$445.47 million.

Family and early life
His grandfather was Ali Mohammed Ahmed Al Othaim (1882-1966), who was born in Buraidah, Al-Qassim then studied in Iraq and went back to his hometown to be a cleric. His father was Saleh Ali Al Othaim, who in the mid 1950s had founded a retail business in Hillat al-Qasman, east of Al Batha, Riyadh.

Abdullah was born in 1960 in Riyadh. He went to the Qadisiyah Primary School, and later enrolled in a college but dropped off to work with his father.

Career 
After his father's death, Abdullah and his brothers inherited Riyal 17 million. After everyone received his share, they went within different ventures, and Abdullah was the only one to continue with his father's retail business. He founded Abdullah Al-Othaim Markets in 1980, and throughout the years he has worked on expanding the business. In 2000, Abdullah Al-Othaim Markets became a limited liability company. Later, it was split into three companies, Abdullah Al Othaim Markets, which was listed in Tadawul in 2008, Al Othaim Real Estate Investment and Development Company, and Al Othaim Holding Company.

Today, Al Othaim Holding is one of the Arab world's most successful and diversified business organizations, highly respected in the field of investments and recognized as an elite player in the Persian Gulf region. 

Al-Othaim was the chairman of the General Council for Qassim Chamber of Commerce. He was appointed a board member of Saudi Industrial Property Authority. In 2015 he was appointed a board member of Saudi Credit and Saving Bank.

Al-Othaim was listed on the 500 Most Powerful Muslims List in Islamica Magazine.

Personal life 
He has six brothers; Mohammed (died 1987), Abdulaziz, Ahmed, Suliman, Ali, and Khaled.

See also

References

20th-century Saudi Arabian businesspeople
21st-century Saudi Arabian businesspeople
1960 births
Living people
Place of birth missing (living people)
Saudi Arabian billionaires